The 1944 United States House of Representatives elections were elections for the United States House of Representatives to elect members to serve in the 79th United States Congress. They were held for the most part on November 7, 1944, while Maine held theirs on September 11. These elections coincided with President Franklin D. Roosevelt's re-election to a record fourth term.

Roosevelt's popularity allowed his Democratic Party to gain twenty seats from the Republicans and minor parties, cementing the Democratic majority. Also, Americans rallied behind allied success in World War II, and in turn voted favorably for the administration's course of action.

, this is the last time the House of Representatives was made up of four parties (in December 2020, House Republican Paul Mitchell became an Independent, resulting in there being four partisan affiliations (Republican, Democratic, Independent, and Libertarian) though not four political parties).

Special elections 

Twelve special elections were held, sorted by election date.

|-
! 
| James P. McGranery
|  | Democratic
| 1936
|  | Incumbent resigned November 17, 1943.New representative elected January 18, 1944.Republican gain.Winner was subsequently redistricted to the 3rd district and re-elected in November.
| nowrap | 

|-
! 
| J. William Ditter
|  | Republican
| 1932
|  | Incumbent died November 21, 1943.New representative elected January 18, 1944.Republican hold.Winner was subsequently redistricted to the 16th district and re-elected in November.
| nowrap | 

|-
! 
| Joseph A. Gavagan
|  | Democratic
| 1929 
|  | Incumbent resigned December 30, 1943.New representative elected February 29, 1944.Democratic hold.Winner was subsequently re-elected in November.
| nowrap | 

|-
! 
| Lawrence Lewis
|  | Democratic
| 1932
|  | Incumbent died December 9, 1943.New representative elected March 7, 1944.Republican gain.Winner was subsequently re-elected in November.
| nowrap | 

|-
! 
| Henry B. Steagall
|  | Democratic
| 1914
|  | Incumbent died November 22, 1943.New representative elected March 14, 1944.Democratic hold.Winner was subsequently re-elected in November.
| nowrap | 

|-
! 
| John C. Nichols
|  | Democratic
| 1934
|  | Incumbent resigned July 3, 1943.New representative elected March 28, 1944.Democratic hold.Winner was subsequently re-elected in November.
| nowrap | 

|-
! 
| Thomas H. Cullen
|  | Democratic
| 1918
|  | Incumbent died March 1, 1944.New representative elected June 6, 1944.Democratic hold.Winner was subsequently redistricted to the 12th district and re-elected in November.
| nowrap | 

|-
! 
| James A. O'Leary
|  | Democratic
| 1934
|  | Incumbent died March 16, 1944.New representative elected June 6, 1944.Republican gain.Winner was subsequently redistricted to the 16th district and re-elected in November.
| nowrap | 

|-
! 
| William H. Wheat
|  | Republican
| 1938
|  | Incumbent died January 16, 1944.New representative elected June 13, 1944.Republican hold.Winner was subsequently re-elected in November.
| nowrap | 

|-
! 
| James R. Domengeaux
|  | Democratic
| 1940
|  | Incumbent resigned April 15, 1944 to join the armed forces but was later medically discharged.Incumbent re-elected November 7, 1944 to fill his own vacancy.
| nowrap | 

|-
! 
| Winder R. Harris
|  | Democratic
| 1941 
|  | Incumbent resigned September 15, 1944.New representative elected November 7, 1944.Democratic hold.Winner was also elected to the next term, see below.
| nowrap | 

|-
! 
| Hampton P. Fulmer
|  | Democratic
| 1932
|  | Incumbent died October 19, 1944.New representative elected November 7, 1944, see Widow's succession.Democratic hold.Winner did not run for the next term, see below.
| nowrap | 

|}

Overall results

Source: Election Statistics - Office of the Clerk

Alabama 

|-
! 
| Frank W. Boykin
|  | Democratic
| 1935 
| Incumbent re-elected.
| nowrap | 

|-
! 
| George M. Grant
|  | Democratic
| 1938
| Incumbent re-elected.
| nowrap | 

|-
! 
| George W. Andrews
|  | Democratic
| 1944 
| Incumbent re-elected.
| nowrap | 

|-
! 
| Sam Hobbs
|  | Democratic
| 1934
| Incumbent re-elected.
| nowrap | 

|-
! 
| Joe Starnes
|  | Democratic
| 1934
|  | Incumbent lost renomination.New member elected.Democratic hold.
| nowrap | 

|-
! 
| Pete Jarman
|  | Democratic
| 1936
| Incumbent re-elected.
| nowrap | 

|-
! 
| Carter Manasco
|  | Democratic
| 1941 
| Incumbent re-elected.
| nowrap | 

|-
! 
| John Sparkman
|  | Democratic
| 1936
| Incumbent re-elected.
| nowrap | 

|-
! 
| John P. Newsome
|  | Democratic
| 1942
|  | Incumbent lost renomination.New member elected.Democratic hold.
| nowrap | 

|}

Arizona 

|-
! 
| John R. Murdock
|  | Democratic
| 1936
| Incumbent re-elected.
| rowspan=2 nowrap | 

|-
! 
| Richard F. Harless
|  | Democratic
| 1942
| Incumbent re-elected.

|}

Arkansas 

|-
! 
| Ezekiel C. Gathings
|  | Democratic
| 1938
| Incumbent re-elected.
| nowrap | 

|-
! 
| Wilbur Mills
|  | Democratic
| 1938
| Incumbent re-elected.
| nowrap | 

|-
! 
| J. William Fulbright
|  | Democratic
| 1942
|  | Incumbent retired to run for U.S. senator.New member elected.Democratic hold.
| nowrap | 

|-
! 
| William Fadjo Cravens
|  | Democratic
| 1939 
| Incumbent re-elected.
| nowrap | 

|-
! 
| Brooks Hays
|  | Democratic
| 1942
| Incumbent re-elected.
| nowrap | 

|-
! 
| William F. Norrell
|  | Democratic
| 1938
| Incumbent re-elected.
| nowrap | 

|-
! 
| Oren Harris
|  | Democratic
| 1940
| Incumbent re-elected.
| nowrap | 

|}

California 

|-
! 
| Clarence F. Lea
|  | Democratic
| 1916
| Incumbent re-elected.
| nowrap | 

|-
! 
| Clair Engle
|  | Democratic
| 1943 
| Incumbent re-elected.
| nowrap | 

|-
! 
| J. Leroy Johnson
|  | Republican
| 1942
| Incumbent re-elected.
| nowrap | 

|-
! 
| Thomas Rolph
|  | Republican
| 1940
|  | Incumbent lost re-election.New member elected.Democratic gain.
| nowrap | 

|-
! 
| Richard J. Welch
|  | Republican
| 1926
| Incumbent re-elected.
| nowrap | 

|-
! 
| Albert E. Carter
|  | Republican
| 1924
|  | Incumbent lost re-election.New member elected.Democratic gain.
| nowrap | 

|-
! 
| John H. Tolan
|  | Democratic
| 1934
| Incumbent re-elected.
| nowrap | 

|-
! 
| Jack Z. Anderson
|  | Republican
| 1938
| Incumbent re-elected.
| nowrap | 

|-
! 
| Bertrand W. Gearhart
|  | Republican
| 1934
| Incumbent re-elected.
| nowrap | 

|-
! 
| Alfred J. Elliott
|  | Democratic
| 1937 
| Incumbent re-elected.
| nowrap | 

|-
! 
| George E. Outland
|  | Democratic
| 1942
| Incumbent re-elected.
| nowrap | 

|-
! 
| Jerry Voorhis
|  | Democratic
| 1936
| Incumbent re-elected.
| nowrap | 

|-
! 
| Norris Poulson
|  | Republican
| 1942
|  | Incumbent lost re-election.New member elected.Democratic gain.
| nowrap | 

|-
! 
| Thomas F. Ford
|  | Democratic
| 1932
|  | Incumbent retired.New member elected.Democratic hold.
| nowrap | 

|-
! 
| John M. Costello
|  | Democratic
| 1934
|  | Incumbent lost renomination.New member elected.Republican gain.
| nowrap | 

|-
! 
| Will Rogers Jr.
|  | Democratic
| 1942
|  | Incumbent resigned May 23, 1944 to serve in U.S. Army.New member elected.Democratic hold.
| nowrap | 

|-
! 
| Cecil R. King
|  | Democratic
| 1942
| Incumbent re-elected.
| nowrap | 

|-
! 
| William Ward Johnson
|  | Republican
| 1940
|  | Incumbent lost re-election.New member elected.Democratic gain.
| nowrap | 

|-
! 
| Chet Holifield
|  | Democratic
| 1942
| Incumbent re-elected.
| nowrap | 

|-
! 
| John Carl Hinshaw
|  | Republican
| 1938
| Incumbent re-elected.
| nowrap | 

|-
! 
| Harry R. Sheppard
|  | Democratic
| 1936
| Incumbent re-elected.
| nowrap | 

|-
! 
| John J. Phillips
|  | Republican
| 1942
| Incumbent re-elected.
| nowrap | 

|-
! 
| Edouard Izac
|  | Democratic
| 1936
| Incumbent re-elected.
| nowrap | 

|}

Colorado 

|-
! 
| Dean M. Gillespie
|  | Republican
| 1944 
| Incumbent re-elected.
| nowrap | 

|-
! 
| William S. Hill
|  | Republican
| 1940
| Incumbent re-elected.
| nowrap | 

|-
! 
| John Chenoweth
|  | Republican
| 1940
| Incumbent re-elected.
| nowrap | 

|-
! 
| Robert F. Rockwell
|  | Republican
| 1941 
| Incumbent re-elected.
| nowrap | 

|}

Connecticut 

|-
! 
| William J. Miller
|  | Republican
| 1942
|  | Incumbent lost re-election.New member elected.Democratic gain.
| nowrap | 

|-
! 
| John D. McWilliams
|  | Republican
| 1942
|  | Incumbent lost re-election.New member elected.Democratic gain.
| nowrap | 

|-
! 
| Ranulf Compton
|  | Republican
| 1942
|  | Incumbent lost re-election.New member elected.Democratic gain.
| nowrap | 

|-
! 
| Clare Boothe Luce
|  | Republican
| 1942
| Incumbent re-elected.
| nowrap | 

|-
! 
| Joseph E. Talbot
|  | Republican
| 1942
| Incumbent re-elected.
| nowrap | 

|-
! 
| B. J. Monkiewicz
|  | Republican
| 1942
|  | Incumbent lost re-election.New member elected.Democratic gain.
| nowrap | 

|}

Delaware 

|-
! 
| Earle D. Willey
|  | Republican
| 1942
|  | Incumbent lost re-election.New member elected.Democratic gain.
| nowrap | 

|}

Florida 

Florida redistricted for this cycle, converting the 6th seat it had previously gained at reapportionment from an at-large seat to an additional district near Fort Lauderdale.

|-
! 
| J. Hardin Peterson
|  | Democratic
| 1932
| Incumbent re-elected.
| nowrap | 

|-
! 
| Emory H. Price
|  | Democratic
| 1942
| Incumbent re-elected.
| nowrap | 

|-
! 
| Bob Sikes
|  | Democratic
| 1940
| Incumbent re-elected.
| nowrap | 

|-
! 
| Pat Cannon
|  | Democratic
| 1938
| Incumbent re-elected.
| nowrap | 

|-
! 
| Joe Hendricks
|  | Democratic
| 1936
| Incumbent re-elected.
| nowrap | 

|-
! 
| Robert A. Green
|  | Democratic
| 1942
|  | Incumbent retired to run for Governor of Florida.New member elected.Democratic hold.
| nowrap | 

|}

Georgia 

|-
! 
| Hugh Peterson
|  | Democratic
| 1934
| Incumbent re-elected.
| nowrap | 

|-
! 
| Edward E. Cox
|  | Democratic
| 1924
| Incumbent re-elected.
| nowrap | 

|-
! 
| Stephen Pace
|  | Democratic
| 1936
| Incumbent re-elected.
| nowrap | 

|-
! 
| Albert Sidney Camp
|  | Democratic
| 1939 
| Incumbent re-elected.
| nowrap | 

|-
! 
| Robert Ramspeck
|  | Democratic
| 1929 
| Incumbent re-elected.
| nowrap | 

|-
! 
| Carl Vinson
|  | Democratic
| 1914
| Incumbent re-elected.
| nowrap | 

|-
! 
| Malcolm C. Tarver
|  | Democratic
| 1926
| Incumbent re-elected.
| nowrap | 

|-
! 
| John S. Gibson
|  | Democratic
| 1940
| Incumbent re-elected.
| nowrap | 

|-
! 
| B. Frank Whelchel
|  | Democratic
| 1934
|  | Incumbent retired.New member elected.Democratic hold.
| nowrap | 

|-
! 
| Paul Brown
|  | Democratic
| 1933 
| Incumbent re-elected.
| nowrap | 

|}

Idaho 

|-
! 
| Compton I. White
|  | Democratic
| 1932
| Incumbent re-elected.
| nowrap | 

|-
! 
| Henry Dworshak
|  | Republican
| 1938
| Incumbent re-elected.
| nowrap | 

|}

Illinois 

|-
! 
| William L. Dawson
|  | Democratic
| 1942
| Incumbent re-elected.
| nowrap | 

|-
! 
| William A. Rowan
|  | Democratic
| 1942
| Incumbent re-elected.
| nowrap | 

|-
! 
| Fred E. Busbey
|  | Republican
| 1942
|  | Incumbent lost re-election.New member elected.Democratic gain.
| nowrap | 

|-
! 
| Martin Gorski
|  | Democratic
| 1942
| Incumbent re-elected.
| nowrap | 

|-
! 
| Adolph J. Sabath
|  | Democratic
| 1906
| Incumbent re-elected.
| nowrap | 

|-
! 
| Thomas J. O'Brien
|  | Democratic
| 1942
| Incumbent re-elected.
| nowrap | 

|-
! 
| colspan=3 | Vacant
|  | Leonard W. Schuetz (Democratic) died February 13, 1944New member elected.Democratic gain.
| nowrap | 

|-
! 
| Thomas S. Gordon
|  | Democratic
| 1942
| Incumbent re-elected.
| nowrap | 

|-
! 
| Charles S. Dewey
|  | Republican
| 1940
|  | Incumbent lost re-election.New member elected.Democratic gain.
| nowrap | 

|-
! 
| Ralph E. Church
|  | Republican
| 1942
| Incumbent re-elected.
| nowrap | 

|-
! 
| Chauncey W. Reed
|  | Republican
| 1934
| Incumbent re-elected.
| nowrap | 

|-
! 
| Noah M. Mason
|  | Republican
| 1936
| Incumbent re-elected.
| nowrap | 

|-
! 
| Leo E. Allen
|  | Republican
| 1932
| Incumbent re-elected.
| nowrap | 

|-
! 
| Anton J. Johnson
|  | Republican
| 1938
| Incumbent re-elected.
| nowrap | 

|-
! 
| Robert B. Chiperfield
|  | Republican
| 1938
| Incumbent re-elected.
| nowrap | 

|-
! 
| Everett Dirksen
|  | Republican
| 1932
| Incumbent re-elected.
| nowrap | 

|-
! 
| Leslie C. Arends
|  | Republican
| 1934
| Incumbent re-elected.
| nowrap | 

|-
! 
| Jessie Sumner
|  | Republican
| 1938
| Incumbent re-elected.
| nowrap | 

|-
! 
| Rolla C. McMillen
|  | Republican
| 1944 
| Incumbent re-elected.
| nowrap | 

|-
! 
| Sid Simpson
|  | Republican
| 1942
| Incumbent re-elected.
| nowrap | 

|-
! 
| George Evan Howell
|  | Republican
| 1940
| Incumbent re-elected.
| nowrap | 

|-
! 
| Calvin D. Johnson
|  | Republican
| 1942
|  | Incumbent lost re-election.New member elected.Democratic gain.
| nowrap | 

|-
! 
| Charles W. Vursell
|  | Republican
| 1942
| Incumbent re-elected.
| nowrap | 

|-
! 
| James V. Heidinger
|  | Republican
| 1940
| Incumbent re-elected.
| nowrap | 

|-
! 
| C. W. Bishop
|  | Republican
| 1940
| Incumbent re-elected.
| nowrap | 

|-
! 
| Stephen A. Day
|  | Republican
| 1940
|  | Incumbent lost re-election.New member elected.Democratic gain.
| nowrap | 

|}

Indiana 

|-
! 
| Ray Madden
|  | Democratic
| 1942
| Incumbent re-elected.
| nowrap | 

|-
! 
| Charles A. Halleck
|  | Republican
| 1935 
| Incumbent re-elected.
| nowrap | 

|-
! 
| Robert A. Grant
|  | Republican
| 1938
| Incumbent re-elected.
| nowrap | 

|-
! 
| George W. Gillie
|  | Republican
| 1938
| Incumbent re-elected.
| nowrap | 

|-
! 
| Forest A. Harness
|  | Republican
| 1938
| Incumbent re-elected.
| nowrap | 

|-
! 
| Noble J. Johnson
|  | Republican
| 1938
| Incumbent re-elected.
| nowrap | 

|-
! 
| Gerald W. Landis
|  | Republican
| 1938
| Incumbent re-elected.
| nowrap | 

|-
! 
| Charles M. La Follette
|  | Republican
| 1942
| Incumbent re-elected.
| nowrap | 

|-
! 
| Earl Wilson
|  | Republican
| 1940
| Incumbent re-elected.
| nowrap | 

|-
! 
| Raymond S. Springer
|  | Republican
| 1938
| Incumbent re-elected.
| nowrap | 

|-
! 
| Louis Ludlow
|  | Democratic
| 1928
| Incumbent re-elected.
| nowrap | 

|}

Iowa 

|-
! 
| Thomas E. Martin
|  | Republican
| 1938
| Incumbent re-elected.
| nowrap | 

|-
! 
| Henry O. Talle
|  | Republican
| 1938
| Incumbent re-elected.
| nowrap | 

|-
! 
| John W. Gwynne
|  | Republican
| 1934
| Incumbent re-elected.
| nowrap | 

|-
! 
| Karl M. LeCompte
|  | Republican
| 1938
| Incumbent re-elected.
| nowrap | 

|-
! 
| Paul Cunningham
|  | Republican
| 1940
| Incumbent re-elected.
| nowrap | 

|-
! 
| Fred C. Gilchrist
|  | Republican
| 1930
|  | Incumbent lost renomination.New member elected.Republican hold.
| nowrap | 

|-
! 
| Ben F. Jensen
|  | Republican
| 1938
| Incumbent re-elected.
| nowrap | 

|-
! 
| Charles B. Hoeven
|  | Republican
| 1942
| Incumbent re-elected.
| nowrap | 

|}

Kansas 

|-
! 
| William P. Lambertson
|  | Republican
| 1928
|  | Incumbent lost renomination.New member elected.Republican hold.
| nowrap | 

|-
! 
| Errett P. Scrivner
|  | Republican
| 1943 
| Incumbent re-elected.
| nowrap | 

|-
! 
| Thomas Daniel Winter
|  | Republican
| 1938
| Incumbent re-elected.
| nowrap | 

|-
! 
| Edward Herbert Rees
|  | Republican
| 1936
| Incumbent re-elected.
| nowrap | 

|-
! 
| Clifford R. Hope
|  | Republican
| 1926
| Incumbent re-elected.
| nowrap | 

|-
! 
| Frank Carlson
|  | Republican
| 1934
| Incumbent re-elected.
| nowrap | 

|}

Kentucky 

|-
! 
| Noble Jones Gregory
|  | Democratic
| 1936
| Incumbent re-elected.
| nowrap | 

|-
! 
| Beverly M. Vincent
|  | Democratic
| 1937 
|  | Incumbent retired.New member elected.Democratic hold.
| nowrap | 

|-
! 
| Emmet O'Neal
|  | Democratic
| 1934
| Incumbent re-elected.
| nowrap | 

|-
! 
| Chester O. Carrier
|  | Republican
| 1943 
|  | Incumbent lost re-election.New member elected.Democratic gain.
| nowrap | 

|-
! 
| Brent Spence
|  | Democratic
| 1930
| Incumbent re-elected.
| nowrap | 

|-
! 
| Virgil Chapman
|  | Democratic
| 1930
| Incumbent re-elected.
| nowrap | 

|-
! 
| Andrew J. May
|  | Democratic
| 1930
| Incumbent re-elected.
| nowrap | 

|-
! 
| Joe B. Bates
|  | Democratic
| 1930
| Incumbent re-elected.
| nowrap | 

|-
! 
| John M. Robsion
|  | Republican
| 1934
| Incumbent re-elected.
| nowrap | 

|}

Louisiana 

|-
! 
| F. Edward Hébert
|  | Democratic
| 1940
| Incumbent re-elected.
| nowrap | 

|-
! 
| Paul H. Maloney
|  | Democratic
| 1942
| Incumbent re-elected.
| nowrap | 

|-
! 
| James R. Domengeaux
|  | Democratic
| 1940
| Incumbent re-elected.
| nowrap | 

|-
! 
| Overton Brooks
|  | Democratic
| 1936
| Incumbent re-elected.
| nowrap | 

|-
! 
| Charles E. McKenzie
|  | Democratic
| 1942
| Incumbent re-elected.
| nowrap | 

|-
! 
| James H. Morrison
|  | Democratic
| 1942
| Incumbent re-elected.
| nowrap | 

|-
! 
| Henry D. Larcade Jr.
|  | Democratic
| 1942
| Incumbent re-elected.
| nowrap | 

|-
! 
| A. Leonard Allen
|  | Democratic
| 1936
| Incumbent re-elected.
| nowrap | 

|}

Maine 

|-
! 
| Robert Hale
|  | Republican
| 1942
| Incumbent re-elected.
| nowrap | 

|-
! 
| Margaret Chase Smith
|  | Republican
| 1940
| Incumbent re-elected.
| nowrap | 

|-
! 
| Frank Fellows
|  | Republican
| 1940
| Incumbent re-elected.
| nowrap | 

|}

Maryland 

|-
! 
| David Jenkins Ward
|  | Democratic
| 1939 
|  | Incumbent lost renomination.New member elected.Democratic hold.
| nowrap | 

|-
! 
| Harry Streett Baldwin
|  | Democratic
| 1942
| Incumbent re-elected.
| nowrap | 

|-
! 
| Thomas D'Alesandro Jr.
|  | Democratic
| 1938
| Incumbent re-elected.
| nowrap | 

|-
! 
| Daniel Ellison
|  | Republican
| 1942
|  | Incumbent lost re-election.New member elected.Democratic gain.
| nowrap | 

|-
! 
| Lansdale Sasscer
|  | Democratic
| 1939 
| Incumbent re-elected.
| nowrap | 

|-
! 
| James Glenn Beall
|  | Republican
| 1942
| Incumbent re-elected.
| nowrap | 

|}

Massachusetts 

|-
! 
| Allen T. Treadway
|  | Republican
| 1912
|  | Incumbent retired.New member elected.Republican hold.
| nowrap | 

|-
! 
| Charles R. Clason
|  | Republican
| 1936
| Incumbent re-elected.
| nowrap | 

|-
! 
| Philip J. Philbin
|  | Democratic
| 1942
| Incumbent re-elected.
| nowrap | 

|-
! 
| Pehr G. Holmes
|  | Republican
| 1930
| Incumbent re-elected.
| nowrap | 

|-
! 
| Edith Nourse Rogers
|  | Republican
| 1925 
| Incumbent re-elected.
| nowrap | 

|-
! 
| George J. Bates
|  | Republican
| 1936
| Incumbent re-elected.
| nowrap | 

|-
! 
| Thomas J. Lane
|  | Democratic
| 1941 
| Incumbent re-elected.
| nowrap | 

|-
! 
| Angier Goodwin
|  | Republican
| 1942
| Incumbent re-elected.
| nowrap | 

|-
! 
| Charles L. Gifford
|  | Republican
| 1922
| Incumbent re-elected.
| nowrap | 

|-
! 
| Christian Herter
|  | Republican
| 1942
| Incumbent re-elected.
| nowrap | 

|-
! 
| James Michael Curley
|  | Democratic
| 1942
| Incumbent re-elected.
| nowrap | 

|-
! 
| John W. McCormack
|  | Democratic
| 1928
| Incumbent re-elected.
| nowrap | 

|-
! 
| Richard B. Wigglesworth
|  | Republican
| 1928
| Incumbent re-elected.
| nowrap | 

|-
! 
| Joseph W. Martin Jr.
|  | Republican
| 1924
| Incumbent re-elected.
| nowrap | 

|}

Michigan 

|-
! 
| George G. Sadowski
|  | Democratic
| 1942
| Incumbent re-elected.
| nowrap | 

|-
! 
| Earl C. Michener
|  | Republican
| 1934
| Incumbent re-elected.
| nowrap | 

|-
! 
| Paul W. Shafer
|  | Republican
| 1936
| Incumbent re-elected.
| nowrap | 

|-
! 
| Clare E. Hoffman
|  | Republican
| 1934
| Incumbent re-elected.
| nowrap | 

|-
! 
| Bartel J. Jonkman
|  | Republican
| 1940
| Incumbent re-elected.
| nowrap | 

|-
! 
| William W. Blackney
|  | Republican
| 1938
| Incumbent re-elected.
| nowrap | 

|-
! 
| Jesse P. Wolcott
|  | Republican
| 1930
| Incumbent re-elected.
| nowrap | 

|-
! 
| Fred L. Crawford
|  | Republican
| 1934
| Incumbent re-elected.
| nowrap | 

|-
! 
| Albert J. Engel
|  | Republican
| 1934
| Incumbent re-elected.
| nowrap | 

|-
! 
| Roy O. Woodruff
|  | Republican
| 1920
| Incumbent re-elected.
| nowrap | 

|-
! 
| Frederick Van Ness Bradley
|  | Republican
| 1938
| Incumbent re-elected.
| nowrap | 

|-
! 
| John B. Bennett
|  | Republican
| 1942
|  | Incumbent lost re-election.New member elected.Democratic gain.
| nowrap | 

|-
! 
| George D. O'Brien
|  | Democratic
| 1940
| Incumbent re-elected.
| nowrap | 

|-
! 
| Louis C. Rabaut
|  | Democratic
| 1934
| Incumbent re-elected.
| nowrap | 

|-
! 
| John Dingell Sr.
|  | Democratic
| 1932
| Incumbent re-elected.
| nowrap | 

|-
! 
| John Lesinski Sr.
|  | Democratic
| 1932
| Incumbent re-elected.
| nowrap | 

|-
! 
| George A. Dondero
|  | Republican
| 1932
| Incumbent re-elected.
| nowrap | 

|}

Minnesota 

|-
! 
| August H. Andresen
|  | Republican
| 1934
| Incumbent re-elected.
| nowrap | 

|-
! 
| Joseph P. O'Hara
|  | Republican
| 1940
| Incumbent re-elected.
| nowrap | 

|-
! 
| Richard Pillsbury Gale
|  | Republican
| 1940
|  | Incumbent lost re-election.New member elected. gain.
| nowrap | 

|-
! 
| Melvin J. Maas
|  | Republican
| 1934
|  | Incumbent lost re-election.New member elected. gain.
| nowrap | 

|-
! 
| Walter Judd
|  | Republican
| 1942
| Incumbent re-elected.
| nowrap | 

|-
! 
| Harold Knutson
|  | Republican
| 1934
| Incumbent re-elected.
| nowrap | 

|-
! 
| H. Carl Andersen
|  | Republican
| 1938
| Incumbent re-elected.
| nowrap | 

|-
! 
| William Alvin Pittenger
|  | Republican
| 1938
| Incumbent re-elected.
| nowrap | 

|-
! 
| Harold Hagen
|  | Farmer-Labor
| 1942
|  | Incumbent re-elected as a Republican.Republican gain.
| nowrap | 

|}

Mississippi 

|-
! 
| John E. Rankin
|  | Democratic
| 1920
| Incumbent re-elected.
| nowrap | 

|-
! 
| Jamie Whitten
|  | Democratic
| 1941 
| Incumbent re-elected.
| nowrap | 

|-
! 
| William Madison Whittington
|  | Democratic
| 1924
| Incumbent re-elected.
| nowrap | 

|-
! 
| Thomas Abernethy
|  | Democratic
| 1942
| Incumbent re-elected.
| nowrap | 

|-
! 
| W. Arthur Winstead
|  | Democratic
| 1942
| Incumbent re-elected.
| nowrap | 

|-
! 
| William M. Colmer
|  | Democratic
| 1932
| Incumbent re-elected.
| nowrap | 

|-
! 
| Dan R. McGehee
|  | Democratic
| 1934
| Incumbent re-elected.
| nowrap | 

|}

Missouri 

|-
! 
| Samuel W. Arnold
|  | Republican
| 1942
| Incumbent re-elected.
| nowrap | 

|-
! 
| Max Schwabe
|  | Republican
| 1942
| Incumbent re-elected.
| nowrap | 

|-
! 
| William C. Cole
|  | Republican
| 1942
| Incumbent re-elected.
| nowrap | 

|-
! 
| C. Jasper Bell
|  | Democratic
| 1934
| Incumbent re-elected.
| nowrap | 

|-
! 
| Roger C. Slaughter
|  | Democratic
| 1942
| Incumbent re-elected.
| nowrap | 

|-
! 
| Marion T. Bennett
|  | Republican
| 1943 
| Incumbent re-elected.
| nowrap | 

|-
! 
| Dewey Short
|  | Republican
| 1934
| Incumbent re-elected.
| nowrap | 

|-
! 
| William P. Elmer
|  | Republican
| 1942
|  | Incumbent lost re-election.New member elected.Democratic gain.
| nowrap | 

|-
! 
| Clarence Cannon
|  | Democratic
| 1922
| Incumbent re-elected.
| nowrap | 

|-
! 
| Orville Zimmerman
|  | Democratic
| 1934
| Incumbent re-elected.
| nowrap | 

|-
! 
| Louis E. Miller
|  | Republican
| 1942
|  | Incumbent lost re-election.New member elected.Democratic gain.
| nowrap | 

|-
! 
| Walter C. Ploeser
|  | Republican
| 1940
| Incumbent re-elected.
| nowrap | 

|-
! 
| John J. Cochran
|  | Democratic
| 1926
| Incumbent re-elected.
| nowrap | 

|}

Montana 

|-
! 
| Mike Mansfield
|  | Democratic
| 1942
| Incumbent re-elected.
| nowrap | 

|-
! 
| James F. O'Connor
|  | Democratic
| 1936
| Incumbent re-elected.
| nowrap | 

|}

Nebraska 

|-
! 
| Carl Curtis
|  | Republican
| 1938
| Incumbent re-elected.
| nowrap | 

|-
! 
| Howard Buffett
|  | Republican
| 1942
| Incumbent re-elected.
| nowrap | 

|-
! 
| Karl Stefan
|  | Republican
| 1934
| Incumbent re-elected.
| nowrap | 

|-
! 
| Arthur L. Miller
|  | Republican
| 1942
| Incumbent re-elected.
| nowrap | 

|}

Nevada 

|-
! 
| Maurice J. Sullivan
|  | Democratic
| 1942
|  | Incumbent lost renomination.New member elected.Democratic hold.
| nowrap | 

|}

New Hampshire 

|-
! 
| Chester Earl Merrow
|  | Republican
| 1942
| Incumbent re-elected.
| nowrap | 

|-
! 
| Foster Waterman Stearns
|  | Republican
| 1938
|  | Incumbent retired to run for U.S. Senator.New member elected.Republican hold.
| nowrap | 

|}

New Jersey 

|-
! 
| Charles A. Wolverton
|  | Republican
| 1926
| Incumbent re-elected.
| nowrap | 

|-
! 
| Elmer H. Wene
|  | Democratic
| 1940
|  | Incumbent retired to run for U.S. Senator.New member elected.Republican gain.
| nowrap | 

|-
! 
| James C. Auchincloss
|  | Republican
| 1942
| Incumbent re-elected.
| nowrap | 

|-
! 
| D. Lane Powers
|  | Republican
| 1932
| Incumbent re-elected.
| nowrap | 

|-
! 
| Charles A. Eaton
|  | Republican
| 1924
| Incumbent re-elected.
| nowrap | 

|-
! 
| Donald H. McLean
|  | Republican
| 1932
|  | Incumbent retired.New member elected.Republican hold.
| nowrap | 

|-
! 
| J. Parnell Thomas
|  | Republican
| 1936
| Incumbent re-elected.
| nowrap | 

|-
! 
| Gordon Canfield
|  | Republican
| 1940
| Incumbent re-elected.
| nowrap | 

|-
! 
| Harry Lancaster Towe
|  | Republican
| 1942
| Incumbent re-elected.
| nowrap | 

|-
! 
| Fred A. Hartley Jr.
|  | Republican
| 1928
| Incumbent re-elected.
| nowrap | 

|-
! 
| Frank Sundstrom
|  | Republican
| 1942
| Incumbent re-elected.
| nowrap | 

|-
! 
| Robert Kean
|  | Republican
| 1938
| Incumbent re-elected.
| nowrap | 

|-
! 
| Mary Teresa Norton
|  | Democratic
| 1924
| Incumbent re-elected.
| nowrap | 

|-
! 
| Edward J. Hart
|  | Democratic
| 1934
| Incumbent re-elected.
| nowrap | 

|}

New Mexico 

|-
! 
| Clinton Anderson
|  | Democratic
| 1940
| Incumbent re-elected.
| rowspan=2 nowrap | 

|-
! 
| Antonio M. Fernández
|  | Democratic
| 1942
| Incumbent re-elected.

|}

New York 

New York, after having used 2 at-large districts to avoid redistricting at the last reapportionment, redistricted into 45 districts for this election, with substantial boundary changes across the state. Manhattan went from 10 districts to 6, with Long Island, Brooklyn and Queens going from 10 to 15.

|-
! 
| colspan=3 | None (District created)
|  | New seat.New member elected.Republican gain.
| nowrap | 

|-
! 
| Leonard W. Hall
|  | Republican
| 1938
| Incumbent re-elected.
| nowrap | 

|-
! 
| colspan=3 | None (District created)
|  | New seat.New member elected.Republican gain.
| nowrap | 

|-
! 
| William Bernard Barry
|  | Democratic
| 1935 
| Incumbent re-elected.
| nowrap | 

|-
! 
| colspan=3 | None (District created)
|  | New seat.New member elected.Democratic gain.
| nowrap | 

|-
! 
| colspan=3 | None (District created)
|  | New seat.New member elected.Democratic gain.
| nowrap | 

|-
! 
| John J. Delaney
|  | Democratic
| 1931 
| Incumbent re-elected.
| nowrap | 

|-
! 
| Joseph L. Pfeifer
|  | Democratic
| 1934
| Incumbent re-elected.
| nowrap | 

|-
! 
| Eugene James Keogh
|  | Democratic
| 1936
| Incumbent re-elected.
| nowrap | 

|-
! 
| Andrew Lawrence Somers
|  | Democratic
| 1924
| Incumbent re-elected.
| nowrap | 

|-
! 
| James J. Heffernan
|  | Democratic
| 1940
| Incumbent re-elected.
| nowrap | 

|-
! 
| John J. Rooney
|  | Democratic
| 1944 
| Incumbent re-elected.
| nowrap | 

|-
! 
| Donald Lawrence O'Toole
|  | Democratic
| 1936
| Incumbent re-elected.
| nowrap | 

|-
! 
| colspan=3 | None (District created)
|  | New seat.New member elected.Democratic gain.
| nowrap | 

|-
! 
| Emanuel Celler
|  | Democratic
| 1922
| Incumbent re-elected.
| nowrap | 

|-
! 
| Ellsworth B. Buck
|  | Republican
| 1944 
| Incumbent re-elected.
| nowrap | 

|-
! rowspan=2 | 
| Joseph C. Baldwin
|  | Republican
| 1941 
| Incumbent re-elected.
| rowspan=2 nowrap | 

|-
| James H. Fay
|  | Democratic
| 1942
|  | Incumbent retired.Democratic loss.

|-
! rowspan=2 | 
| Martin J. Kennedy
|  | Democratic
| 1930
|  | Incumbent lost renomination.Democratic loss.
| rowspan=2 nowrap | 

|-
| Vito Marcantonio
|  | Labor
| 1938
| Incumbent re-elected.

|-
! rowspan=3 | 
| Samuel Dickstein
|  | Democratic
| 1922
| Incumbent re-elected.
| rowspan=3 nowrap | 

|-
| Louis Capozzoli
|  | Democratic
| 1940
|  | Incumbent retired.Democratic loss.

|-
| Arthur George Klein
|  | Democratic
| 1941 
|  | Incumbent retired.Democratic loss.

|-
! rowspan=2 | 
| Thomas F. Burchill
|  | Democratic
| 1942
|  | Incumbent retired.Democratic loss.
| rowspan=2 nowrap | 

|-
| Sol Bloom
|  | Democratic
| 1923 
| Incumbent re-elected.

|-
! 
| James H. Torrens
|  | Democratic
| 1944 
| Incumbent re-elected.
| nowrap | 

|-
! 
| colspan=3 | None (District created)
|  | New seat.New member elected.Democratic gain.
| nowrap | 

|-
! 
| Walter A. Lynch
|  | Democratic
| 1940
| Incumbent re-elected.
| nowrap | 

|-
! 
| colspan=3 | None (District created)
|  | New seat.New member elected.Democratic gain.
| nowrap | 

|-
! 
| Charles A. Buckley
|  | Democratic
| 1934
| Incumbent re-elected.
| nowrap | 

|-
! 
| James M. Fitzpatrick
|  | Democratic
| 1926
|  | Incumbent retired.New member elected.Democratic hold.
| nowrap | 

|-
! 
| colspan=3 | None (District created)
|  | New seat.New member elected.Republican gain.
| nowrap | 

|-
! 
| Ralph A. Gamble
|  | Republican
| 1937 
| Incumbent re-elected.
| nowrap | 

|-
! 
| Hamilton Fish III
|  | Republican
| 1920
|  | Incumbent lost re-election.New member elected.Republican hold.
| nowrap | 

|-
! 
| Jay Le Fevre
|  | Republican
| 1942
| Incumbent re-elected.
| nowrap | 

|-
! 
| Bernard W. Kearney
|  | Republican
| 1942
| Incumbent re-elected.
| nowrap | 

|-
! 
| William T. Byrne
|  | Democratic
| 1936
| Incumbent re-elected.
| nowrap | 

|-
! 
| Dean P. Taylor
|  | Republican
| 1942
| Incumbent re-elected.
| nowrap | 

|-
! 
| Clarence E. Kilburn
|  | Republican
| 1940
| Incumbent re-elected.
| nowrap | 

|-
! rowspan=2 | 
| Hadwen C. Fuller
|  | Republican
| 1943 
| Incumbent re-elected.
| rowspan=2 nowrap | 

|-
| Fred J. Douglas
|  | Republican
| 1936
|  | Incumbent lost renomination.Republican loss.

|-
! 
| Clarence E. Hancock
|  | Republican
| 1927 
| Incumbent re-elected.
| nowrap | 

|-
! 
| Edwin Arthur Hall
|  | Republican
| 1939 
| Incumbent re-elected.
| nowrap | 

|-
! 
| John Taber
|  | Republican
| 1922
| Incumbent re-elected.
| nowrap | 

|-
! 
| W. Sterling Cole
|  | Republican
| 1934
| Incumbent re-elected.
| nowrap | 

|-
! 
| Joseph J. O'Brien
|  | Republican
| 1938
|  | Incumbent lost re-election.New member elected.Democratic gain.
| nowrap | 

|-
! 
| James Wolcott Wadsworth Jr.
|  | Republican
| 1932
| Incumbent re-elected.
| nowrap | 

|-
! 
| Walter Gresham Andrews
|  | Republican
| 1930
| Incumbent re-elected.
| nowrap | 

|-
! 
| Joseph Mruk
|  | Republican
| 1942
|  | Incumbent lost renomination.New member elected.Republican hold.
| nowrap | 

|-
! 
| John Cornelius Butler
|  | Republican
| 1941 
| Incumbent re-elected.
| nowrap | 

|-
! 
| Daniel A. Reed
|  | Republican
| 1918
| Incumbent re-elected.
| nowrap | 

|-
| rowspan=2 | 
| Winifred C. Stanley
|  | Republican
| 1942
|  | Incumbent retired.New member elected.Republican loss.
|

|-
| Matthew J. Merritt
|  | Democratic
| 1934
|  | Incumbent retired.New member elected.Democratic loss.
|

|}

North Carolina 

|-
! 
| Herbert Covington Bonner
|  | Democratic
| 1940
| Incumbent re-elected.
| nowrap | 

|-
! 
| John H. Kerr
|  | Democratic
| 1923 
| Incumbent re-elected.
| nowrap | 

|-
! 
| Graham Arthur Barden
|  | Democratic
| 1934
| Incumbent re-elected.
| nowrap | 

|-
! 
| Harold D. Cooley
|  | Democratic
| 1934
| Incumbent re-elected.
| nowrap | 

|-
! 
| John Hamlin Folger
|  | Democratic
| 1941 
| Incumbent re-elected.
| nowrap | 

|-
! 
| Carl T. Durham
|  | Democratic
| 1938
| Incumbent re-elected.
| nowrap | 

|-
! 
| J. Bayard Clark
|  | Democratic
| 1928
| Incumbent re-elected.
| nowrap | 

|-
! 
| William O. Burgin
|  | Democratic
| 1938
| Incumbent re-elected.
| nowrap | 

|-
! 
| Robert L. Doughton
|  | Democratic
| 1910
| Incumbent re-elected.
| nowrap | 

|-
! 
| Cameron A. Morrison
|  | Democratic
| 1942
|  | Incumbent retired.New member elected.Democratic hold.
| nowrap | 

|-
! 
| Alfred L. Bulwinkle
|  | Democratic
| 1930
| Incumbent re-elected.
| nowrap | 

|-
! 
| Zebulon Weaver
|  | Democratic
| 1930
| Incumbent re-elected.
| nowrap | 

|}

North Dakota 

|-
! 
| William Lemke
|  | Republican
| 1942
| Incumbent re-elected.
| rowspan=2 nowrap | 

|-
! 
| Usher L. Burdick
|  | Republican
| 1934
|  | Incumbent retired to run for U. S. senator, but lost that nomination and then lost re-election as an Independent.New member elected.Republican hold.

|}

Ohio 

|-
! 
| Charles H. Elston
|  | Republican
| 1938
| Incumbent re-elected.
| nowrap | 

|-
! 
| William E. Hess
|  | Republican
| 1938
| Incumbent re-elected.
| nowrap | 

|-
! 
| Harry P. Jeffrey
|  | Republican
| 1942
|  | Incumbent lost re-election.New member elected.Democratic gain.
| nowrap | 

|-
! 
| Robert Franklin Jones
|  | Republican
| 1938
| Incumbent re-elected.
| nowrap | 

|-
! 
| Cliff Clevenger
|  | Republican
| 1938
| Incumbent re-elected.
| nowrap | 

|-
! 
| Edward O. McCowen
|  | Republican
| 1942
| Incumbent re-elected.
| nowrap | 

|-
! 
| Clarence J. Brown
|  | Republican
| 1938
| Incumbent re-elected.
| nowrap | 

|-
! 
| Frederick C. Smith
|  | Republican
| 1938
| Incumbent re-elected.
| nowrap | 

|-
! 
| Homer A. Ramey
|  | Republican
| 1942
| Incumbent re-elected.
| nowrap | 

|-
! 
| Thomas A. Jenkins
|  | Republican
| 1924
| Incumbent re-elected.
| nowrap | 

|-
! 
| Walter E. Brehm
|  | Republican
| 1942
| Incumbent re-elected.
| nowrap | 

|-
! 
| John M. Vorys
|  | Republican
| 1938
| Incumbent re-elected.
| nowrap | 

|-
! 
| Alvin F. Weichel
|  | Republican
| 1942
| Incumbent re-elected.
| nowrap | 

|-
! 
| Edmund Rowe
|  | Republican
| 1942
|  | Incumbent lost re-election.New member elected.Democratic gain.
| nowrap | 

|-
! 
| Percy W. Griffiths
|  | Republican
| 1942
| Incumbent re-elected.
| nowrap | 

|-
! 
| Henderson H. Carson
|  | Republican
| 1942
|  | Incumbent lost re-election.New member elected.Democratic gain.
| nowrap | 

|-
! 
| J. Harry McGregor
|  | Republican
| 1940
| Incumbent re-elected.
| nowrap | 

|-
! 
| Earl R. Lewis
|  | Republican
| 1942
| Incumbent re-elected.
| nowrap | 

|-
! 
| Michael J. Kirwan
|  | Democratic
| 1936
| Incumbent re-elected.
| nowrap | 

|-
! 
| Michael A. Feighan
|  | Democratic
| 1942
| Incumbent re-elected.
| nowrap | 

|-
! 
| Robert Crosser
|  | Democratic
| 1922
| Incumbent re-elected.
| nowrap | 

|-
! 
| Frances P. Bolton
|  | Republican
| 1940
| Incumbent re-elected.
| nowrap | 

|-
! 
| George H. Bender
|  | Republican
| 1938
| Incumbent re-elected.
| nowrap | 

|}

Oklahoma 

|-
! 
| Wesley E. Disney
|  | Democratic
| 1930
|  | Incumbent retired to run for U.S. Senator.New member elected.Republican gain.
| nowrap | 

|-
! 
| William G. Stigler
|  | Democratic
| 1944 
| Incumbent re-elected.
| nowrap | 

|-
! 
| Paul Stewart
|  | Democratic
| 1942
| Incumbent re-elected.
| nowrap | 

|-
! 
| Lyle Boren
|  | Democratic
| 1936
| Incumbent re-elected.
| nowrap | 

|-
! 
| Mike Monroney
|  | Democratic
| 1938
| Incumbent re-elected.
| nowrap | 

|-
! 
| Jed Johnson
|  | Democratic
| 1926
| Incumbent re-elected.
| nowrap | 

|-
! 
| Victor Wickersham
|  | Democratic
| 1941 
| Incumbent re-elected.
| nowrap | 

|-
! 
| Ross Rizley
|  | Republican
| 1940
| Incumbent re-elected.
| nowrap | 

|}

Oregon 

|-
! 
| James W. Mott
|  | Republican
| 1932
| Incumbent re-elected.
| nowrap | 

|-
! 
| Lowell Stockman
|  | Republican
| 1942
| Incumbent re-elected.
| nowrap | 

|-
! 
| Homer D. Angell
|  | Republican
| 1938
| Incumbent re-elected.
| nowrap | 

|-
! 
| Harris Ellsworth
|  | Republican
| 1942
| Incumbent re-elected.
| nowrap | 

|}

Pennsylvania 

Pennsylvania redistricted from 32 districts and an at-large seat to 33 districts.

|-
! 
| James A. Gallagher
|  | Republican
| 1942
|  | Incumbent lost re-election.New member elected.Democratic gain.
| nowrap | 

|-
! 
| Francis J. Myers
|  | Democratic
| 1938
|  | Incumbent retired to run for U.S. Senator.New member elected.Democratic hold.
| nowrap | 

|-
! rowspan=2 | 
| Michael J. Bradley
|  | Democratic
| 1936
| Incumbent re-elected.
| rowspan=2 nowrap | 

|-
| Joseph Marmaduke Pratt
|  | Republican
| 1944 
|  | Incumbent lost re-election.Republican loss.

|-
! 
| John E. Sheridan
|  | Democratic
| 1939 
| Incumbent re-elected.
| nowrap | 

|-
! 
| C. Frederick Pracht
|  | Republican
| 1942
|  | Incumbent lost re-election.New member elected.Democratic gain.
| nowrap | 

|-
! 
| Hugh Scott
|  | Republican
| 1940
|  | Incumbent lost re-election.New member elected.Democratic gain.
| nowrap | 

|-
! 
| James Wolfenden
|  | Republican
| 1928
| Incumbent re-elected.
| nowrap | 

|-
! 
| Charles L. Gerlach
|  | Republican
| 1938
| Incumbent re-elected.
| nowrap | 

|-
! 
| J. Roland Kinzer
|  | Republican
| 1930
| Incumbent re-elected.
| nowrap | 

|-
! 
| John W. Murphy
|  | Democratic
| 1942
| Incumbent re-elected.
| nowrap | 

|-
! 
| Thomas B. Miller
|  | Republican
| 1942
|  | Incumbent lost re-election.New member elected.Democratic gain.
| nowrap | 

|-
! 
| Ivor D. Fenton
|  | Republican
| 1938
| Incumbent re-elected.
| nowrap | 

|-
! 
| Daniel K. Hoch
|  | Democratic
| 1942
| Incumbent re-elected.
| nowrap | 

|-
! 
| Wilson D. Gillette
|  | Republican
| 1941 
| Incumbent re-elected.
| nowrap | 

|-
! 
| colspan=3 | None (District created)
|  | New seat.New member elected.Republican gain.
| nowrap | 

|-
! 
| Samuel K. McConnell Jr.
|  | Republican
| 1944 
| Incumbent re-elected.
| nowrap | 

|-
! 
| Richard M. Simpson
|  | Republican
| 1937 
| Incumbent re-elected.
| nowrap | 

|-
! 
| John C. Kunkel
|  | Republican
| 1938
| Incumbent re-elected.
| nowrap | 

|-
! 
| Leon H. Gavin
|  | Republican
| 1942
| Incumbent re-elected.
| nowrap | 

|-
! 
| Francis E. Walter
|  | Democratic
| 1932
| Incumbent re-elected.
| nowrap | 

|-
! 
| Chester H. Gross
|  | Republican
| 1942
| Incumbent re-elected.
| nowrap | 

|-
! 
| D. Emmert Brumbaugh
|  | Republican
| 1943 
| Incumbent re-elected.
| nowrap | 

|-
! 
| J. Buell Snyder
|  | Democratic
| 1932
| Incumbent re-elected.
| nowrap | 

|-
! 
| Grant Furlong
|  | Democratic
| 1942
|  | Incumbent lost renomination.New member elected.Democratic hold.
| nowrap | 

|-
! 
| Louis E. Graham
|  | Republican
| 1938
| Incumbent re-elected.
| nowrap | 

|-
! 
| Harve Tibbott
|  | Republican
| 1938
| Incumbent re-elected.
| nowrap | 

|-
! 
| Augustine B. Kelley
|  | Democratic
| 1940
| Incumbent re-elected.
| nowrap | 

|-
! 
| Robert L. Rodgers
|  | Republican
| 1938
| Incumbent re-elected.
| nowrap | 

|-
! 
| colspan=3 | None (District created)
|  | New seat.New member elected.Republican gain.
| nowrap | 

|-
! 
| Thomas E. Scanlon
|  | Democratic
| 1940
|  | Incumbent lost re-election.New member elected.Republican gain.
| nowrap | 

|-
! 
| James A. Wright
|  | Democratic
| 1940
|  | Incumbent lost re-election.New member elected.Republican gain.
| nowrap | 

|-
! 
| Herman P. Eberharter
|  | Democratic
| 1936
| Incumbent re-elected.
| nowrap | 

|-
! 
| Samuel A. Weiss
|  | Democratic
| 1940
| Incumbent re-elected.
| nowrap | 

|-
| 
| William I. Troutman
|  | Republican
| 1942
|  | Incumbent retired.District eliminated.Republican loss.

|}

Rhode Island 

|-
! 
| Aime Forand
|  | Democratic
| 1940
| Incumbent re-elected.
| nowrap | 

|-
! 
| John E. Fogarty
|  | Democratic
| 1940
| Incumbent re-elected.
| nowrap | 

|}

South Carolina 

|-
! 
| L. Mendel Rivers
|  | Democratic
| 1940
| Incumbent re-elected.
| nowrap | 

|-
! 
| colspan=3 | Vacant
|  | Hampton P. Fulmer (Democratic) died October 19, 1944New member elected.Democratic hold.
| nowrap | 

|-
! 
| Butler B. Hare
|  | Democratic
| 1938
| Incumbent re-elected.
| nowrap | 

|-
! 
| Joseph R. Bryson
|  | Democratic
| 1938
| Incumbent re-elected.
| nowrap | 

|-
! 
| James P. Richards
|  | Democratic
| 1932
| Incumbent re-elected.
| nowrap | 

|-
! 
| John L. McMillan
|  | Democratic
| 1938
| Incumbent re-elected.
| nowrap | 

|}

South Dakota 

|-
! 
| Karl E. Mundt
|  | Republican
| 1938
| Incumbent re-elected.
| nowrap | 

|-
! 
| Francis H. Case
|  | Republican
| 1936
| Incumbent re-elected.
| nowrap | 

|}

Tennessee 

|-
! 
| B. Carroll Reece
|  | Republican
| 1932
| Incumbent re-elected.
| nowrap | 

|-
! 
| John Jennings
|  | Republican
| 1939 
| Incumbent re-elected.
| nowrap | 

|-
! 
| Estes Kefauver
|  | Democratic
| 1939 
| Incumbent re-elected.
| nowrap | 

|-
! 
| Albert Gore Sr.
|  | Democratic
| 1938
| Incumbent re-elected.
| nowrap | 

|-
! 
| Jim Nance McCord
|  | Democratic
| 1942
|  | Incumbent retired to run for Governor of Tennessee.New member elected.Democratic hold.
| nowrap | 

|-
! 
| Percy Priest
|  | Democratic
| 1940
| Incumbent re-elected.
| nowrap | 

|-
! 
| W. Wirt Courtney
|  | Democratic
| 1939 
| Incumbent re-elected.
| nowrap | 

|-
! 
| Tom J. Murray
|  | Democratic
| 1942
| Incumbent re-elected.
| nowrap | 

|-
! 
| Jere Cooper
|  | Democratic
| 1928
| Incumbent re-elected.
| nowrap | 

|-
! 
| Clifford Davis
|  | Democratic
| 1940
| Incumbent re-elected.
| nowrap | 

|}

Texas 

|-
! 
| Wright Patman
|  | Democratic
| 1928
| Incumbent re-elected.
| nowrap | 

|-
! 
| Martin Dies Jr.
|  | Democratic
| 1930
|  | Incumbent retired.New member elected.Democratic hold.
| nowrap | 

|-
! 
| Lindley Beckworth
|  | Democratic
| 1938
| Incumbent re-elected.
| nowrap | 

|-
! 
| Sam Rayburn
|  | Democratic
| 1912
| Incumbent re-elected.
| nowrap | 

|-
! 
| Hatton W. Sumners
|  | Democratic
| 1914
| Incumbent re-elected.
| nowrap | 

|-
! 
| Luther A. Johnson
|  | Democratic
| 1922
| Incumbent re-elected.
| nowrap | 

|-
! 
| Nat Patton
|  | Democratic
| 1934
|  | Incumbent lost renomination.New member elected.Democratic hold.
| nowrap | 

|-
! 
| Albert Thomas
|  | Democratic
| 1936
| Incumbent re-elected.
| nowrap | 

|-
! 
| Joseph J. Mansfield
|  | Democratic
| 1916
| Incumbent re-elected.
| nowrap | 

|-
! 
| Lyndon B. Johnson
|  | Democratic
| 1937 
| Incumbent re-elected.
| nowrap | 

|-
! 
| William R. Poage
|  | Democratic
| 1936
| Incumbent re-elected.
| nowrap | 

|-
! 
| Fritz G. Lanham
|  | Democratic
| 1919 
| Incumbent re-elected.
| nowrap | 

|-
! 
| Ed Gossett
|  | Democratic
| 1938
| Incumbent re-elected.
| nowrap | 

|-
! 
| Richard M. Kleberg
|  | Democratic
| 1931 
|  | Incumbent lost renomination.New member elected.Democratic hold.
| nowrap | 

|-
! 
| Milton H. West
|  | Democratic
| 1933 
| Incumbent re-elected.
| nowrap | 

|-
! 
| R. Ewing Thomason
|  | Democratic
| 1930
| Incumbent re-elected.
| nowrap | 

|-
! 
| Sam M. Russell
|  | Democratic
| 1940
| Incumbent re-elected.
| nowrap | 

|-
! 
| Eugene Worley
|  | Democratic
| 1940
| Incumbent re-elected.
| nowrap | 

|-
! 
| George H. Mahon
|  | Democratic
| 1934
| Incumbent re-elected.
| nowrap | 

|-
! 
| Paul J. Kilday
|  | Democratic
| 1938
| Incumbent re-elected.
| nowrap | 

|-
! 
| O. C. Fisher
|  | Democratic
| 1942
| Incumbent re-elected.
| nowrap | 

|}

Utah 

|-
! 
| Walter K. Granger
|  | Democratic
| 1940
| Incumbent re-elected.
| nowrap | 

|-
! 
| J. W. Robinson
|  | Democratic
| 1932
| Incumbent re-elected.
| nowrap | 

|}

Vermont 

|-
! 
| Charles Albert Plumley
|  | Republican
| 1934
| Incumbent re-elected.
| nowrap | 

|}

Virginia 

|-
! 
| S. Otis Bland
|  | Democratic
| 1918
| Incumbent re-elected.
| nowrap | 

|-
! 
| colspan=3 | Vacant
|  | Winder R. Harris (Democratic) resigned September 15, 1944.New member elected.Democratic gain.
| nowrap | 

|-
! 
| Dave E. Satterfield Jr.
|  | Democratic
| 1937 
| Incumbent re-elected.
| nowrap | 

|-
! 
| Patrick H. Drewry
|  | Democratic
| 1920
| Incumbent re-elected.
| nowrap | 

|-
! 
| Thomas G. Burch
|  | Democratic
| 1930
| Incumbent re-elected.
| nowrap | 

|-
! 
| Clifton A. Woodrum
|  | Democratic
| 1922
| Incumbent re-elected.
| nowrap | 

|-
! 
| Absalom Willis Robertson
|  | Democratic
| 1932
| Incumbent re-elected.
| nowrap | 

|-
! 
| Howard W. Smith
|  | Democratic
| 1930
| Incumbent re-elected.
| nowrap | 

|-
! 
| John W. Flannagan Jr.
|  | Democratic
| 1930
| Incumbent re-elected.
| nowrap | 

|}

Washington 

|-
! 
| Warren Magnuson
|  | Democratic
| 1936
|  | Incumbent retired to run for U.S. senator.New member elected.Democratic hold.
| nowrap | 

|-
! 
| Henry M. Jackson
|  | Democratic
| 1940
| Incumbent re-elected.
| nowrap | 

|-
! 
| Fred B. Norman
|  | Republican
| 1942
|  | Incumbent lost re-election.New member elected.Democratic gain.
| nowrap | 

|-
! 
| Hal Holmes
|  | Republican
| 1942
| Incumbent re-elected.
| nowrap | 

|-
! 
| Walt Horan
|  | Republican
| 1942
| Incumbent re-elected.
| nowrap | 

|-
! 
| John M. Coffee
|  | Democratic
| 1936
| Incumbent re-elected.
| nowrap | 

|}

West Virginia 

|-
! 
| A. C. Schiffler
|  | Republican
| 1942
|  | Incumbent lost re-election.New member elected.Democratic gain.
| nowrap | 

|-
! 
| Jennings Randolph
|  | Democratic
| 1932
| Incumbent re-elected.
| nowrap | 

|-
! 
| Edward G. Rohrbough
|  | Republican
| 1942
|  | Incumbent lost re-election.New member elected.Democratic gain.
| nowrap | 

|-
! 
| Hubert S. Ellis
|  | Republican
| 1942
| Incumbent re-elected.
| nowrap | 

|-
! 
| John Kee
|  | Democratic
| 1932
| Incumbent re-elected.
| nowrap | 

|-
! 
| Joe L. Smith
|  | Democratic
| 1928
|  | Incumbent retired.New member elected.Democratic hold.
| nowrap | 

|}

Wisconsin 

|-
! 
| Lawrence H. Smith
|  | Republican
| 1941 
| Incumbent re-elected.
| nowrap | 

|-
! 
| Harry Sauthoff
|  | Progressive
| 1940
|  | Incumbent retired to run for U.S. senator.New member elected.Republican gain.
| nowrap | 

|-
! 
| William H. Stevenson
|  | Republican
| 1940
| Incumbent re-elected.
| nowrap | 

|-
! 
| Thaddeus Wasielewski
|  | Democratic
| 1940
| Incumbent re-elected.
| nowrap | 

|-
! 
| Howard J. McMurray
|  | Democratic
| 1942
|  | Incumbent retired to run for U.S. senator.New member elected.Democratic hold.
| nowrap | 

|-
! 
| Frank B. Keefe
|  | Republican
| 1938
| Incumbent re-elected.
| nowrap | 

|-
! 
| Reid F. Murray
|  | Republican
| 1938
| Incumbent re-elected.
| nowrap | 

|-
! 
| LaVern Dilweg
|  | Democratic
| 1942
|  | Incumbent lost re-election.New member elected.Republican gain.
| nowrap | 

|-
! 
| Merlin Hull
|  | Progressive
| 1934
| Incumbent re-elected.
| nowrap | 

|-
! 
| Alvin O'Konski
|  | Republican
| 1942
| Incumbent re-elected.
| nowrap | 

|}

Wyoming 

|-
! 
| Frank A. Barrett
|  | Republican
| 1942
| Incumbent re-elected.
| nowrap | 

|}

Non-voting delegates 

|-
! 
| Anthony Dimond
|  | Democratic
| 1932
|  | Incumbent retired to become a judge.New member elected September 13, 1944.Democratic hold.
| nowrap | 

|-
! 
| Joseph R. Farrington
|  | Republican
| 1942
| Incumbent re-elected November 7, 1944.
| nowrap | 

|-
! 
| Joaquín Miguel Elizalde
|  | Nonpartisan
| Appointed 1938
| bgcolor= | Incumbent resigned August 9, 1944.New Resident commissioner appointed.Liberal gain.Successor was to hold office at the pleasure of the President of the Philippines.
| nowrap | 

|}

See also
 1944 United States elections
 1944 United States Senate elections
 1944 United States presidential election
 78th United States Congress
 79th United States Congress

Notes

References

 
United States home front during World War II